Köld is the third album by Icelandic post-metal band Sólstafir. It was released on January 21, 2009 through Spinefarm Records. The cover art was done by Guðmundur Óli Pálmason. It was recorded in Göteborg and all the songs are in English, except the title song "Köld".

In December 2019, Sólstafir performed a five-date European tour to celebrate the 10th anniversary of Köld'''s release.

Track listing
 "78 Days in the Desert" – 8:34
 "Köld" – 8:59
 "Pale Rider" – 8:05
 "She Destroys Again" – 7:12
 "Necrologue" – 8:30
 "World Void of Souls" – 11:51
 "Love is the Devil (and I am in Love)" – 4:43
 "Goddess of the Ages" – 12:41

Reception
In a March 2009 review, Arnar Eggert Thoroddsen of Morgunblaðið gave the record 4 stars out of 5, calling it a "Freezing cold beauty". In October 2009, Flosi Þorgeirsson of Reykjavík Grapevine stated that it was"Definitely one of the best Icelandic albums of the year''".

References

External links
Kold @ Sólstafir official site

2009 albums
Sólstafir albums
Spinefarm Records albums